Acadiana Mall (French: Centre commercial de l’Acadiana) is an enclosed regional shopping mall in the city of Lafayette, Louisiana, located at the intersection of Johnston Street (U.S. Route 167) and Ambassador Caffery Parkway (Louisiana Highway 3073). It opened in 1979 and was developed by Robert B. Aikens & Associates, but is now owned by Namdar Realty Group. Currently, Acadiana Mall houses three department store anchors (Dillard's, JCPenney and Macy's). In 2015, Sears Holdings spun off 235 of its properties, including the Sears at Acadiana Mall, into Seritage Growth Properties. Sears closed in September 2017 leaving its site vacant. On June 4, 2020, it was announced that JCPenney would be closing as part of a plan to close 154 stores nationwide. However this store was removed from the closing list on July 13, 2020.

JCPenney built in 1990 on the site of a closed Selber Brothers, while Dillard's was formerly D. H. Holmes. The Macy's store opened as Goudchaux's/Maison Blanche, and was sold to Parisian in 1998. Parisian became Foley's in 2001 before converting again to Macy's in 2006.

The mall received a minor facelift in the early 1990s and a major renovation in 2004, bringing in a more contemporary look. On February 21, 2013, the mall changed its name back to Acadiana Mall.

Hurricane Katrina
In 2005, in the aftermath of Hurricane Katrina, the mall became the assembly-point and staging area for what became known as the Cajun Navy, which was credited with rescuing thousands of flood victims.

References

External links
Acadiana Mall

Shopping malls in Louisiana
Shopping malls established in 1979
Buildings and structures in Lafayette, Louisiana
Tourist attractions in Lafayette Parish, Louisiana
Economy of Lafayette, Louisiana
Namdar Realty Group